Elands River is a river of the Komati River basin in Mpumalanga province, South Africa.

This river is known for the Elands River Falls, located between Waterval Boven and Waterval Onder. These fall 70 m in one drop, and are close to the NZASM tunnel. Also not far from another historical site called the Krugerhof, the last residence of President Stephanus Johannes Paulus Kruger in the South African Republic (ZAR), where there is a Museum.

The river originates near the town of Machadodorp, in the Highveld Zone of Mpumalanga, and after passing over a complex waterfall, joins the right bank of the Crocodile River.

See also
 List of waterfalls of South Africa
 List of rivers of South Africa
Elands River (disambiguation)

References

External links
 Mpumalanga Waterfalls - South Africa

Rivers of Mpumalanga